Greenwood Baseball Field is a baseball venue in Asheville, North Carolina, United States.  It is home to the UNC Asheville Bulldogs baseball team of the NCAA Division I Big South Conference.  The facility opened in 1988.  It has a capacity of 300 spectators.  It features an electronic scoreboard, dugouts, and a natural grass surface.

UNC Asheville also uses McCormick Field, home of the Asheville Tourists minor league baseball team, for a portion of its schedule.

See also
 List of NCAA Division I baseball venues

References 

College baseball venues in the United States
Baseball venues in North Carolina
UNC Asheville Bulldogs baseball
1988 establishments in North Carolina
Sports venues completed in 1988